Hammond Pond Parkway is a historic parkway in Chestnut Hill, Massachusetts. The road, built in 1932, extends  from Hobart Road (at Beacon Street) in Newton to Horace James Circle in Brookline, where it joins the West Roxbury Parkway. It was designed by Charles Eliot and the Olmsted Brothers to provide a parkway setting that provided access from Brookline, Newton, and the western portions of Boston to the southern parks of the Emerald Necklace. The parkway was listed on the National Register of Historic Places in 2004.

Route description

The roadway is generally four lanes of paved asphalt. From its northern end at Beacon Street, it runs for roughly two-thirds of a mile with no intersections while passing through a conservation area consisting of the Hammond Pond Reservation and the Webster Conservation Area,. It crosses the MBTA Green Line D branch, formerly the Highland branch of the Boston and Albany Railroad, along the way, and has at grade intersections for Boston College's Robstein Art Center, The Shops at Chestnut Hill and The Street Chestnut Hill before reaching an interchange with Massachusetts Route 9 at roughly its midpoint.  

To the south of the malls, apartment and condominium buildings are on both sides. Farther to the south, the east side of the parkway has a residential area of larger homes with expansive lawns, while the west side is adjacent to the DCR Lost Pond Reservation and the Town of Brookline's Skyline Park.  The parkway ends at Horace James Circle, a junction with the West Roxbury Parkway, Newton Street, LaGrange Street, and Hammond Street.

History
Land acquisition for the parkway began in 1914 based on designs that were drafted in 1913. Additional land was acquired in 1920, and again in 1930-31. The northern section, between Beacon Street and Route 9, was built in 1931, and the southern section was completed in 1932. Construction was by the M. McDonough Company, and cost over $216,000. Only minor changes have been made to the parkway since its construction. The parkway construction included two significant bridges: the Route 9 overpass, and the bridge which passes over the railroad tracks.

In 2021, the Department of Conservation and Recreation proposed to redesign the portion of the parkway north of Route 9. The redesigned parkway would have just one traffic lane in each direction. A 12-foot-wide shared-use lane for bicycles and pedestrians would be built on the west side of the roadway, separated from the traffic lanes by a landscaped median.

Major intersections

See also
 National Register of Historic Places listings in Newton, Massachusetts

References

Roads on the National Register of Historic Places in Massachusetts
Parkways in Massachusetts
Transportation in Middlesex County, Massachusetts
Transportation in Norfolk County, Massachusetts
National Register of Historic Places in Newton, Massachusetts
Historic districts in Middlesex County, Massachusetts
Historic districts in Norfolk County, Massachusetts
National Register of Historic Places in Brookline, Massachusetts
Historic districts on the National Register of Historic Places in Massachusetts
Parks on the National Register of Historic Places in Massachusetts